The 1978 Ohio gubernatorial election was held on November 7, 1978. Incumbent Republican Jim Rhodes defeated Democratic nominee Dick Celeste with 49.31% of the vote.

Primary elections
Primary elections were held on June 6, 1978.

Democratic primary

Candidates
Dick Celeste, incumbent Lieutenant Governor
Dale R. Reusch

Results

Republican primary

Candidates
Jim Rhodes, incumbent Governor
Charles Kurfess, State Representative

Results

General election

Candidates
Major party candidates
Jim Rhodes, Republican
Dick Celeste, Democratic

Other candidates
Patricia Wright, Independent
John O'Neill, Independent
Allan Friedman, Independent

Results

References

1978
Ohio
Gubernatorial